Raindancer was an electroacoustic rock band formed in Newport, Wales in the early 1990s. The band featured Grant Nicholas and Jon Lee, who later became founding members of Feeder.

History 
On 20 June 1991, Raindancer were invited by ITV to perform on a late night show, showcasing up and coming bands, called Stage One.

Members
Grant Nicholas – guitar, vocals
Jon Lee – drums
Simon Blight – guitar
John Canham – bass

References 

Welsh rock music groups